Craghead United F.C. was an English association football club based in the village of Craghead, County Durham. The team initially competed in the Chester-le-Street & District Football League. They unsuccessfully applied to enter the Northern Football Alliance in 1908—receiving no votes from the member clubs—before joining the Northern League in 1912. They finished fifth in both their seasons in the division before leaving the league at the end of the 1913–14 season. Craghead United subsequently submitted another application to the Northern Alliance in 1920 and were accepted into the league along with Backworth United and Hexham Comrades, and the reserve teams of Ashington and Durham City.

Craghead United entered the FA Cup for the first time in the 1907–08 season, but were defeated in the preliminary round by Leadgate Park. The club enjoyed their best run in the Cup during the 1909–10 campaign, defeating Crook Town and Stanley United before losing to Seaham Harbour in the third qualifying round. Craghead United were knocked out in the second qualifying round on two occasions, but generally struggled to progress past the preliminary stage. During their last five seasons in the FA Cup between 1924 and 1929, the team failed to win a single match.

Despite being an amateur team, Craghead United were represented by several players who also played professional football. Walter Coates, who went on to play for Fulham and Leeds United, and Arthur Thomson, who had a spell at Manchester United, both spent some of their early careers at the club. Harry Pringle and Jack Small, who both went on to play in the Football League, both started their careers with Craghead United.

FA Cup history

References

Defunct football clubs in England
Defunct football clubs in County Durham
North Eastern League
Northern Football Alliance
Northern Football League
Stanley, County Durham